There are two other similarly named points in the British Isles: Point of Ayre, Isle of Man and Point of Ayre, Orkney, Scotland.
 
Point of Ayr is the northernmost point of mainland Wales. It is situated immediately to the north of Talacre in Flintshire, at the mouth of the Dee estuary. It is to the southwest of the Liverpool Bay area of the Irish Sea. It is the site of a RSPB (Royal Society for the Protection of Birds) nature reserve RSPB Dee Estuary Point of Ayr, and is part of Gronant and Talacre Dunes Site of Special Scientific Interest.

Coal
For many years a colliery operated at Point of Ayr at the northern extremity of the Flintshire Coalfield; it was one of the last remaining operational deep mines in Wales. The first trial borings took place in 1865, under the direction of Lord Mostyn, owner of Mostyn Colliery, a few miles away. The borings seemed successful, and the Prestatyn Coal Company was formed to commence operations proper, however the project was abandoned before it got off the ground. In 1873, the site was investigated a second time, by a newly formed company, the Western Mostyn Colliery Company, however the trial shaft was not successful, and the project was again abandoned.

In 1883, a third company was formed, the Point of Ayr Colliery Company, and in 1890 they struck a seam. Coal at this time was brought to the surface by a team of 75 pit ponies. A second shaft was also sunk around this time. According to the Inspector of Mines records, in 1896 the pit employed 356 men producing coal for domestic and industrial uses. A third shaft was sunk sometime after the National Coal Board took over the site following nationalisation in 1947. The coal field extended northwards under the Irish Sea. Six men have been killed during the sink of a new shaft on the 4th of July 1952. By 1953, 738 men were producing 213,000 tons of coal annually. Point of Ayr colliery closed on 23 August 1996. Nothing now remains of the colliery. However, like many former coal mines, the name is retained by "Point of Ayr Colliery Band", a Brass Band competing at Championship level.

The site was chosen in the early eighties for a demonstration "Oil from Coal" plant jointly funded by the government, the National Coal Board and others. Bench scale trials was carried out on site but the project became a victim of the miners strike and the subsequent cut back in research funding for this and clean burn technology. The plant never became operational and was scrapped.

Gas
Point of Ayr is also the place where natural gas from the Celtic gas-fields comes ashore. Gas is piped through a pipeline 33.5 km (20 mile) long from the Douglas Complex of gas and petroleum drilling platforms in the Irish Sea. The facilities remove methanol (used for hydrate inhibition), water and condensate. The gas is sweetened with an amine solvent to remove sulphur compounds to below 3.3 ppm and chilled to reduce the hydrocarbon dewpoint. The processing plant was originally part of the BHP development of the Liverpool Bay area, but now owned and operated by Eni. Gas is transported through a 27-km (17 mile) underground pipeline at 30 bar along the North Wales coast to Connah's Quay. After further processing, the gas is sold to Uniper, for their combined cycle gas turbine power station at Connah's Quay, on Deeside, in Flintshire.

Lighthouse

Point of Ayr also gives its name to a lighthouse, built in 1776, though inactive since 1883. It stands on Talacre beach, at the entrance to the River Dee estuary. The lighthouse once displayed two lights. The main beam, at 63 feet, shone seaward towards Llandudno. A secondary beam shone up the River Dee, towards the hamlet of Dawpool, in Cheshire, on the English side of the estuary. Whilst in service, the lighthouse was painted with red and white stripes, and had a red lantern housing. It was replaced in 1844 with a metal pile lighthouse, bearing a white light, put up by order of the Corporation of Trinity House. This new structure was itself replaced in 1883 with a lightship.

See also

Point of Ayr Gas Terminal
List of lighthouses in Wales

References

External links

 Trinity House 

Headlands of Flintshire
Royal Society for the Protection of Birds reserves in Wales
Undersea collieries in the United Kingdom
1952 disasters in the United Kingdom